Bilobalide is a biologically active terpenic trilactone present in Ginkgo biloba.

Chemistry
Bilobalide is a main constituent of the terpenoids found in Ginkgo leaves. It also exists in minor amounts in the roots. It is a sesquiterpenoid, i.e. it has a 15-carbon skeleton. Its exact synthesis pathway from farnesyl pyrophosphate is still unknown.

Biosynthesis
Bilobalide and ginkgolide have similar biosynthetic pathways. Bilobalide is formed by partially degraded ginkgolide. Bilobalide is derived from geranylgeranyl pyrophosphate (GGPP), which is formed by addition of farnesyl pyrophosphate (FPP) to an isopentenyl pyrophosphate (IPP) unit to form a C15 sesquiterpene. Such formation went through the mevalonate pathway (MVA) and methylerythritol phosphate MEP pathway. In order to generate bilobalide, C20 ginkgolide 13 must form first. To transform from GGPP to abietenyl cation 5, a single bifunctional enzyme abietadiene synthase E1 is required. However, due to the complexity of ginkgolide structures for rearrangement, ring cleavage, and formation of lactone rings, diterpene 8 is used to explain instead. Levopimaradiene 6 and abietatriene 7 are precursors for ginkgolide and bilobalide formation. The unusual tert-butyl substituent is formed from A ring cleavage in 9. Bilobalide 13 then formed in loss of carbons through degradation from ginkgolide 12, and lactones are formed from residual carboxyl and alcohol functions. The end product of bilobalide contains sesquiterpenes and three lactones units.

Pharmacology
Bilobalide is important for producing several of the effects of Ginkgo biloba extracts, and it has neuroprotective effects, as well as inducing the liver enzymes CYP3A1 and 1A2, which may be partially responsible for interactions between ginkgo and other herbal medicines or pharmaceutical drugs. Bilobalide has recently been found to be a negative allosteric modulator at the GABAA and GABAA-rho receptors. Of GABAA, it may possibly be selective for the subunits predominantly implicated in cognitive and memory functioning such as α1.

See also
 Ginkgolide

References

External links

Sesquiterpene lactones
Oxygen heterocycles
GABAA receptor negative allosteric modulators
GABAA-rho receptor negative allosteric modulators
Glycine receptor antagonists
Tert-butyl compounds
Heterocyclic compounds with 4 rings
Nootropics